Bulgaria is a country in south-eastern Europe situated in the north-eastern part of the Balkan Peninsula. The country has a great variety of topographical features and diverse landscape ranging from the Alpine snow-capped peaks in Rila, Pirin and the Balkan Mountains to the mild and sunny Black Sea coast; from the typically continental Danubian Plain in the north to the strong Mediterranean climatic influence in the valleys of Macedonia and the lowlands in the southernmost parts of Thrace. The diverse morphological, climatic and hydrological conditions of Bulgaria favour the formation of a large number of geological features.

Partial list of rock formations in Bulgaria

See also

Geography of Bulgaria
List of protected areas of Bulgaria
List of mountains in Bulgaria
List of caves in Bulgaria
List of islands of Bulgaria
List of lakes of Bulgaria

Citations

Sources

References

External links 
 
 

List
Rock formations